ТК-202 was a ballistic missile submarine of the Russian Navy, formerly having served in the Soviet Navy.

Hull number TК-202 was laid down at the Sevmash shipyards in Severodvinsk in  October 1980 and launched in April 1982. It was the second ship of the Soviet Project 941 Akula class (Russian for shark, NATO reporting name Typhoon). In December 1983, she began her commission in the Soviet Northern Fleet. It was, along with the other Akulas, based in Nerpichya Bay, Zapadnaya Litsa.

During its service in the Soviet era it had a name, but it was forgotten. Several of its sibling ships later received names, but the TК-202 and the TК-13 continued to be called by their hull numbers alone. ТК stands for тяжелая крейсерская (tyazholaya kreyserskaya), meaning heavy cruiser.

The 14-year-old submarine was deactivated in 1997, and was laid up from July 1999 at the Sevmash shipyard in Severodvinsk awaiting decommissioning. With funding from the Nunn–Lugar Cooperative Threat Reduction programme the defueling of it reactors started in June 2002 at the Zvezdochka shipyard.

It was scrapped between 2003 and 2005.

Sources 
 deepstorm.ru - TK-202

References 

Typhoon-class submarines
Ships built in the Soviet Union
1982 ships
Cold War submarines of the Soviet Union
Ships of the Russian Northern Fleet
Ships built by Sevmash